George Lusztig (born Gheorghe Lusztig; May 20, 1946) is a Romanian-born American mathematician and Abdun Nur Professor at the Massachusetts Institute of Technology (MIT). He was a Norbert Wiener Professor in the Department of Mathematics from 1999 to 2009.

Education and career
Born in Timișoara to a Hungarian-Jewish family, he did his undergraduate studies at the University of Bucharest, graduating in 1968. Later that year he left Romania for the United Kingdom, where he spent several months at the University of Warwick and Oxford University. In 1969 he moved to the United States, where he went to work for two years with Michael Atiyah at the Institute for Advanced Study in Princeton, New Jersey. He received his PhD in mathematics in 1971 after completing a doctoral dissertation, titled "Novikov's higher signature and families of elliptic operators", under the supervision of William Browder and Michael Atiyah.

Lusztig worked for almost seven years at the University of Warwick. His involvement at the university encompassed a Research Fellowship, (1971–72); lecturer in Mathematics, (1972–74); and Professor of Mathematics, (1974–78). In 1978, he accepted a chair at MIT.

Contributions
He is known for his work on representation theory, in particular for the objects closely related to algebraic groups, such as finite reductive groups, Hecke algebras, -adic groups, quantum groups, and Weyl groups. He essentially paved the way for modern representation theory. This has included fundamental new concepts, including the character sheaves, the Deligne–Lusztig varieties, and the Kazhdan–Lusztig polynomials.

Awards and honors
In 1983, Lusztig was elected as a fellow of the Royal Society. In 1985 Lusztig won the Cole Prize (Algebra). He was elected to the National Academy of Sciences in 1992. He received the Brouwer Medal in 1999, the National Order of Faithful Service in 2003 and the Leroy P. Steele Prize for Lifetime Achievement in Mathematics in 2008. In 2012, he became a fellow of the American Mathematical Society and in 2014 he received the Shaw Prize in Mathematics. In 2022, he received the Wolf Prize in Mathematics.

References

External links

 
 George Lusztig's entry in the International Who's Who.
專訪 George Lusztig 教授 (Interview with Prof. George Lusztig, in Chinese) in 數學傳播. 

1946 births
Living people
20th-century American mathematicians
20th-century Romanian mathematicians
21st-century American mathematicians
21st-century Romanian mathematicians
Academics of the University of Warwick
American people of Romanian-Jewish descent
Brouwer Medalists
Fellows of the American Mathematical Society
Fellows of the Royal Society
Institute for Advanced Study visiting scholars
International Mathematical Olympiad participants
Jewish American scientists
Massachusetts Institute of Technology School of Science faculty
Members of the United States National Academy of Sciences
Princeton University alumni
Recipients of the National Order of Faithful Service
Romanian emigrants to the United States
Romanian Jews
Scientists from Timișoara
University of Bucharest alumni